George Bernard Benedek (born 1 December 1928) is an American physicist currently the Alfred H. Caspary Professor of Physics and Biological Physics and of Health Sciences and Technology Emeritus at Massachusetts Institute of Technology.

He graduated BS in Physics at Rensselaer Polytechnic Institute in 1949, AM in Physics at Harvard University in 1952 and PhD in Physics from Harvard University in 1953; he was a doctoral student of Edward Mills Purcell.

He invented quasi-elastic light scattering spectroscopy and in 1962 was made a Fellow of the American Physical Society. He was awarded their Irving Langmuir Award in 1995.

References

1928 births
Living people
Massachusetts Institute of Technology School of Science faculty
21st-century American physicists
Harvard Graduate School of Arts and Sciences alumni
Members of the United States National Academy of Sciences
Fellows of the American Physical Society
Rensselaer Polytechnic Institute alumni
Members of the National Academy of Medicine